Instrumentals was released September 13, 2005 by Delicious Vinyl Records. It contains the instrumental tracks of songs by The Pharcyde found in their debut album Bizarre Ride II the Pharcyde and its follow up release Labcabincalifornia.

Track listing
 "Oh Shit"
 "4 Better or 4 Worse"
 "I’m That Type of Nigga"
 "On the DL"
 "Officer"
 "Ya Mama"
 "Passin’ Me By"
 "Otha Fish"
 "Return of the B-Boy"
 "Bullshit"
 "Pharcyde"
 "Groupie Therapy"
 "Runnin’"
 "Somethin’ That Means Somethin’"
 "Drop"
 "Devil Music"
 "The E. N. D."

2005 albums
The Pharcyde albums